The Women's combined competition of the Albertville 1992 Olympics was held at Meribel.

The defending world champion was Chantal Bournissen of Switzerland, while Austria's Sabine Ginther was the defending World Cup and 1992 World Cup combined champion.

Results

References 

Women's combined
Alp
Olymp